George Granderson Nash (March 31, 1907 – 	October 1976), also listed as William Nash, was an American baseball pitcher in the Negro leagues. He played with the Birmingham Black Barons, Memphis Red Sox, Nashville Elite Giants, and Indianapolis ABCs/Detroit Stars from 1928 to 1933.

References

External links
 and Seamheads

Birmingham Black Barons players
Indianapolis ABCs (1931–1933) players
Memphis Red Sox players
Nashville Elite Giants players
1907 births
1976 deaths
Baseball players from Birmingham, Alabama
Baseball pitchers
20th-century African-American sportspeople